Men Behind Bars (German: Menschen hinter Gittern) is a 1931 American Pre-Code drama film directed by Pál Fejös and starring Heinrich George, Gustav Diessl and Egon von Jordan. It is the German language version of MGM's The Big House. In the early years of sound before dubbing became widespread, it was common to make films in multiple languages. It premiered in Berlin on June 24, 1931.

Synopsis
The convicts in an overcrowded American prison plot to rise up and stage a massive jailbreak.

Cast
Heinrich George as Butch  
Gustav Diessl as Morris  
Egon von Jordan as Kent Marlow  
Anton Pointner as Supervisor Wallace  
Dita Parlo as Annie Marlow 
Paul Morgan as Putnam 
Herman Bing as lawyer
Peter Erkelenz as Der Gefängnisdirektor  
Karl Etlinger as Gefängniswärter 
Adolf E. Licho as Annie's father  
Hans Heinrich von Twardowski as Oliver

References

External links

1931 drama films
American drama films
Metro-Goldwyn-Mayer films
Films directed by Paul Fejos
American multilingual films
American black-and-white films
1931 multilingual films
1930s American films